A duella was an ancient Roman unit of weight, equivalent to a third of a Roman ounce (9.056 grams).

References

Ancient Roman units of measurement